Yuengling Center (formerly the USF Sun Dome) is an indoor arena on the main campus of the University of South Florida (USF) in Tampa, Florida. Construction began in November 1977, and it opened on November 29, 1980. It is located in USF's Athletics District on the southeast side of campus, and is home to the South Florida Bulls men's and women's basketball and volleyball teams, as well as USF's commencement ceremonies and other school and local events. With 10,411 seats, it is the fourth-largest basketball arena by capacity in the American Athletic Conference.

History
Before the Yuengling Center, USF's basketball teams played at various locations on and off campus. The basketball teams first played at Curtis Hixon Hall in downtown Tampa, and later split their home schedule between Curtis Hixon Hall, the Bayfront Center in St. Petersburg, Expo Hall at the Florida State Fairgrounds, and the USF Gymnasium on campus, among others.

By 1975, both the University of South Florida and the University of Florida in Gainesville had decided to build new on-campus indoor sports facilities. The two schools pooled their resources and shared the cost of a basic arena design to stretch limited state funding. The "core unit" of the Sun Dome and UF's O'Connell Center were nearly identical, and they each featured a flexible, inflatable roof made of Teflon and supported by a system of blowers. However, the O'Connell Center included facilities for other sports (namely gymnastics, volleyball, swimming and diving) around the main arena, while the Sun Dome as originally built did not, though it later added The Corral for the women's volleyball team after a renovation in 1995.

The $12 million Sun Dome broke ground in November 1977 on formerly open land on the southeast side of campus near Fowler Avenue. Construction was slowed on both the Sun Dome and the O'Connell Center when cracks appeared in precast concrete support beams. The problems were eventually fixed, and the sister facilities were completed within a few weeks of each other in late 1980 – the Sun Dome in November and the O'Connell Center in December.

The first two events at the new arena were a USF men's basketball game against Florida A&M and a concert by Alice Cooper.

In 2000, the original inflatable roof was replaced with a more conventional hard dome and additional facilities for USF indoor sports programs were added around the main arena at a cost of about $8 million (about $ in  dollars).

In 2011, USF began a major renovation of the Yuengling Center at a cost of $35.6 million (about $ in  dollars). Among other interior improvements, this renovation reconfigured the seating area to make the facility ADA compliant and LEED Silver certified. It also added a larger center hung scoreboard, a larger team store, a new concourse level with concessions and restrooms, and a new, athletes-only dining hall. On the outside, original exterior concrete was repaired, bricks were added to some portions of the facade, and the entrance gates were improved. This project was completed in April 2012.

In 2017, USF announced that the Sun Dome's management would be taken over by Jeff Vinik, owner of the Tampa Bay Lightning, via Tampa Bay Entertainment Properties, LLC. On June 12, 2018, USF announced a 10-year naming rights deal with brewer Yuengling, effective July 1, 2018.

In April 2021, WWE began a long-term residency at Yuengling Center, broadcasting its shows from a behind closed doors set called the WWE ThunderDome, which lasted until July 2021.

The Corral
The Corral opened in 1995 as the home to the Bulls volleyball team at a cost of $5 million (about $ in  dollars). The Corral spans 11,500 square feet on the west side of the arena with a capacity of up to 1,000 fans. Prior to the opening of The Corral, the volleyball team played in the USF Gymnasium, now called the Campus Recreation Center.

Events
In addition to USF sporting events, the Yuengling Center hosts USF's commencement ceremonies along with many concerts, shows, and special events.

Concert history 
The first concert held at the Yuengling Center (then the USF Sun Dome) was Alice Cooper, on July 25, 1981. The Grateful Dead played at the venue on October 26, 1985, as one of the stops on their 20th anniversary tour. Other acts hosted at the Yuengling Center prior to the renovations completed in 2012 include Drake, Frank Sinatra, Kanye West, Madonna, Tom Petty, and U2. On September 14, 2012, Elton John performed the first concert held in the renovated building.

On September 22, 2017, Arcade Fire performed at the venue, marking their first time performing in Tampa; fellow Canadian indie rock band Wolf Parade served as the concert's opening act. The Swedish band Ghost performed at the Yuengling Center on September 6, 2022, as part of their Imperatour concert tour, with Spiritbox and Mastodon serving as their openers.

Combat sports 
WWE has hosted several professional wrestling events at the Sun Dome; it hosted Saturday Night's Main Event for the first time in 1985, and hosted the pay-per-view Royal Rumble in 1995 (which notably saw Shawn Michaels become the first person entering at number 1 to win the titular Royal Rumble match by outlasting all 29 of the other participants). On March 24, 2021, WWE announced that it would move its ThunderDome residency—a bio-secure bubble used to film the company's weekly programs Raw, SmackDown, and Main Event, as well as those shows' associated pay-per-views, due to the COVID-19 pandemic—to Yuengling Center beginning with the April 12 episode of Raw, following WrestleMania 37 (which was held at Tampa's Raymond James Stadium). The ThunderDome was relocated from Tropicana Field due to the start of the Tampa Bay Rays' 2021 season; as before, programs produced at the arena were held behind closed doors with no in-person audience. During their residency at the Yuengling Center, WWE held two pay-per-view events, WrestleMania Backlash and Hell in a Cell. WWE resumed live touring on July 16, thus ending the ThunderDome productions. The company finished tapings at the Yuengling Center on July 9; the final show to air featuring the ThunderDome at the Yuengling Center was the July 15 episode of Main Event.

Creator Clash was hosted at the Yuengling Center in 2022.

UFC hosted UFC Fight Night: Lauzon vs Stephens at the Sun Dome on February 7, 2009. The Sun Dome also hosted Bellator 72 and 94 in 2012 and 2013 respectively.

See also
 University of South Florida athletic facilities
 List of NCAA Division I basketball arenas

References

External links
Yuengling Center

Basketball venues in Florida
College basketball venues in the United States
Boxing venues in the United States
Gymnastics venues in the United States
Mixed martial arts venues in Florida
South Florida Bulls basketball
Sports venues in Tampa, Florida
Music venues in Florida
Music of Tampa, Florida
1980 establishments in Florida
Sports venues completed in 1980
South Florida Bulls sports venues
Tampa, Florida
Leadership in Energy and Environmental Design basic silver certified buildings